The Rev. John Augustine Zahm (pseudonym H. J. Mozans), CSC (June 14, 1851 – November 10, 1921) was a Holy Cross priest, author, scientist, and explorer of South America. He was born at New Lexington, Ohio, and died in Munich, Germany.

Education and career
Zahm attended the University of Notre Dame in 1867 and graduated with honors in 1871 as a Novice of the Congregation of Holy Cross. He finished his theological studies and was ordained in 1875. Zahm was hired by the University of Notre Dame as a science teacher although he had interest in literature. His brother Albert attended Notre Dame as a student while John was on the faculty.

During his time teaching he wrote the text Sound and Music in 1892. He was appointed the Vice President of Notre Dame at 25 years of age and held the position for nine years. In 1895, he was recognized as Doctor of Philosophy by Pope Leo XIII. Fr. John Zahm championed the view of Notre Dame becoming a research university dedicated to scholarship, which was at odds with Fr. Andrew Morrissey, who hoped to keep the institution a smaller boarding school.

Writing
Father Zahm is the author of many scholarly texts and published works against the Darwin movement. He also wrote Catholic scientific essays published in American Catholic Quarterly and Catholic World, among others.

Father Zahm fought through writing and used his detailed background in science to defend the ability of God and Catholic faith to remain in the scientific sphere. Focusing on Catholic men of science in the past, Zahm founded a magazine, Catholic Science and Catholic Scientists. Between 1891-96, he published multiple books and articles on the topic, culminating with Evolution and Dogma in 1896.

In this text, as in his others, Zahm argued that Roman Catholicism could fully accept an evolutionary view of biological systems, as long as this view was not centered around Darwin's theory of natural selection. After the Vatican decided to censure the book in 1898, Zahm fully accepted this rebuttal and pulled away from any writing concerning the relationship of theology and science.

Fr. Zahm's pseudonym was derived from the way he signed his name as a youth: Jno. S. (Stanislaus, an abandoned middle name) Zahm. His works have been translated into French, Italian, Spanish, and have been published and read  North and South America, as well as in Europe. These include: Woman in Science and Great Inspirers. The Quest for El Dorado, and the general title of his trilogy was "Following the Conquistadores", and the titles of books called Up the Orinoco and Down the Magdalena (1910), Along the Andes and Down the Amazon (1912) and In South America's Southland (1916), all drew from his travels throughout South America. He was an enthusiastic Dante student and assembled at Notre Dame one of the three largest of the Dante libraries in the U.S.

Zahm befriended 26th President of the United States Theodore Roosevelt, who also loved and read Dante in Italian.  It was Father Zahm who talked President Roosevelt into participating in what came to be known as the Roosevelt-Rondon Scientific Expedition to South America, and which would also include Theodore's son, Kermit, and Colonel Da Silva Candido Rondon, to go up the Rio da Dúvida (River of Doubt, now the Roosevelt River).

Death and legacy
Fr. Zahm planned a book on historical and archaeological study of the Holy Land, but died of bronchial pneumonia in a Munich hospital en route to the Middle East. The manuscripts of his working book From Berlin to Baghdad and Babylon was found and published posthumously.

Works authored
Zahn used a number of pseudonyms, mainly H. J. Mozans, but also A. H. Johns, Manso, and A. H. Solis.

Books
 
  (Full Text)
  (Full Text)
  (Full Text). Introduction by Theodore Roosevelt.
  (Full Text)
  (Full Text)

Articles (selection)
J. A. Zahm as "A. H. Johns". "Woman's Work in Bible Study and Translation", in The Catholic World, New York, Vol. 95/June 1912

See also
Zahm Hall, a men's residence hall at Notre Dame named after Fr. Zahm
List of Roman Catholic scientist-clerics

References

Sources
  (1922 Supplement I)
 The River of Doubt by Candice Millard (Doubleday 2005)

Further reading 
Appleby, R. Scott. (1987). Between Americanism and Modernism: John Zahm and Theistic Evolution. Church History. Vol. 56, No. 4. pp. 474–490.
Sloan, Philip R. (2009). Bringing Evolution to Notre Dame: Father John Zahm, C.S.C. and Theistic Evolutionism. American Midland Naturalist. Vol. 161, No. 2. pp. 189–205.
The Catholic Historical Review wrote about John Augustine Zahm: "Dr. John H. Zahm, C. S. C.", The Catholic Historical Review, Vol. 7, No. 4 (Jan., 1922), p. 480, Published by: Catholic University of America Press
Weber, Ralph E. Notre Dame's John Zahm: Catholic Apologist and Educator. (Notre Dame, Indiana: University of Notre Dame Press, 1961)

External links
 Biography of John A. Zahm, C.S.C.
 
 
 
 

1851 births
1921 deaths
American explorers
American Roman Catholic priests
Catholic clergy scientists
American science writers
People from New Lexington, Ohio
Roman Catholic writers
Congregation of Holy Cross
University of Notre Dame faculty
University of Notre Dame alumni
Explorers of Amazonia
Theistic evolutionists
Catholics from Ohio
University of Notre Dame Trustees
Writers from Ohio